The dagesh is a diacritic used in the Hebrew alphabet. It was added to the Hebrew orthography at the same time as the Masoretic system of niqqud (vowel points). It takes the form of a dot placed inside a Hebrew letter and has the effect of modifying the sound in one of two ways.

An identical mark, called mappiq, has a different phonetic function, and can be applied to different consonants; the same mark is also employed in the vowel shuruk.

Dagesh and mappiq symbols are often omitted in writing. The use or omission of such marks is usually consistent throughout any given context. The two functions of dagesh are distinguished as either kal (light) or ḥazak (strong).

Dagesh kal 
They each had two sounds, the original "hard" plosive sound (which originally contained no dagesh pointing as it was the only pronunciation), and a "soft" fricative version produced as such for speech efficiency because of the position in which the mouth is left immediately after a vowel has been produced. 

Prior to the Babylonian captivity, the soft sounds of these letters did not exist in Hebrew, but they were later differentiated in Hebrew writing as a result of the Aramaic-influenced pronunciation of Hebrew after this point in Jewish history. The Aramaic languages, including Jewish versions of Aramaic, have these same allophonic pronunciations of the same letters. 

The letters take on their hard sounds when they have no vowel sound before them, and take their soft sounds when a vowel immediately precedes them. In Biblical-era Hebrew this was the case within a word and also across word boundaries, though in Modern Hebrew no longer across word boundaries since in Modern Hebrew the soft and hard sounds are no longer allophones of each other, but regarded as distinct letters. 

When vowel diacritics are used, the hard sounds are indicated by a central dot called dagesh, while the soft sounds lack a dagesh.  In Modern Hebrew, however, the dagesh only changes the pronunciation of  bet,  kaf, and  pe (traditional Ashkenazic pronunciation also varies the pronunciation of  tav, and some traditional Middle Eastern pronunciations carry alternate forms for  dalet).

{| class="wikitable"
|-
!! colspan=5 | With dagesh
!! colspan=5 | Without dagesh
|-
!! colspan=1 |Symbol
! Name
! Transliteration
! IPA
! Example
!! colspan=1 |Symbol
! Name
! Transliteration
! IPA
! Example
|-
| align=center |   
| bet
| b
| 
| bun
| align=center |   
| vet
| v
| 
| van
|-
| align=center | 
| kaph
| k
| 
| kangaroo
| align=center |   
| khaph
| kh/ch/ḵ
| 
| loch
|-
| align=center | 
| pe 
| p
| 
| pass
| align=center |  
| phe 
| f/ph
| 
| find
|-
|}

In Ashkenazi pronunciation, Tav without a dagesh is pronounced , while in another traditions it is assumed to have been pronounced  at the time niqqud was introduced.  In Modern Hebrew, it is always pronounced .

The letters gimmel (ג) and dalet (ד) may also contain a dagesh kal. The variations are believed to have been: =, =, =, =. The Hebrew spoken by the Jews of Yemen (Yemenite Hebrew) still preserves unique phonemes for these letters with and without a dagesh.

When the letter hey is the final letter of word, it is usually silent, and it indicates the presence of a word-final vowel. When it receives a dagesh kal, however, the hey is pronounced, instead of being silent. This is the rule in historic pronunciation, but this rule is generally ignored in Modern Hebrew. Nevertheless, when a non-silent word-final hey occurs, it can take a furtive patach.

Pronunciation
In Israel's general population, the pronunciation of some of the above letters has become pronounced the same as others:
{| class="wikitable"
|-
!Letter
! pronounced like
! Letter
|-
| align=center | vet
| align=center | (without dagesh) like
| align=center | vav
|-
| align=center | khaf
| align=center | (without dagesh) like
| align=center | chet
|-
| align=center |tav
| align=center | (with dagesh) like
| align=center | tet
|-
| align=center | kaf
| align=center | (with dagesh) like
| align=center | qof  
|-
|}

Dagesh hazak 
Dagesh ḥazak or dagesh ḥazaq ("strong dot", i.e. This gemination is not adhered to in modern Hebrew and is only used in careful pronunciation, such as reading of scriptures in a synagogue service, recitations of biblical or traditional texts or on ceremonious occasions, and then only by very precise readers.

The following letters, the gutturals, almost never have a dagesh: aleph , he , chet , ayin , resh . (A few instances of resh with dagesh are masoretically recorded in the Hebrew Bible, as well as a few cases of aleph with a dagesh, such as in Leviticus 23:17.)

The presence of a dagesh ḥazak or consonant-doubling in a word may be entirely morphological, or, as is often the case, is a lengthening to compensate for a deleted consonant.

A dagesh ḥazak may be placed in letters for one of the following reasons:

 The letter follows the definite article, the word "the". This is because the definite article was originally a stand-alone particle  hal, but at some early stage in ancient Hebrew it contracted into a prefix  'ha-', and the loss of the  'l' was compensated for by doubling the following letter. In this situation where the following letter is a guttural, the vowel in 'ha-' becomes long to compensate for the inability to double the next letter - otherwise, this vowel is almost always short. This also happens in words taking the prefix  'la-', since it is a prefix created by the contraction of  'le-' +  'ha-'. Occasionally, the letter following a He which is used to indicate a question may also receive a dagesh, e.g. Hashshemena hi? - "whether it is fat".
 The letter follows the prefix  'mi-' where this prefix is an abbreviation for the word min, meaning "from".  For example, the phrase "from your hand", if spelled as two words, would be  min yadekha. In Gen. 4:11, however, it occurs as one word:  miyyadekha. This prefix mostly replaces the usage of the particle  min in modern Hebrew.
 The letter follows the prefix  'she-' in modern Hebrew, which is a prefixed contraction of the relative pronoun  asher, where the first letter is dropped and the last letter disappears and doubles the next letter. This prefix is rare in Biblical texts, but mostly replaces the use of  asher in Modern Hebrew.
 It marks the doubling of a letter that is caused by a weak letter losing its vowel. In these situations, the weak letter disappears, and the following letter is doubled to compensate for it. Lamed only behaves as a weak letter in this particular root word, but never anywhere else.
 If the letter follows a vav consecutive imperfect (sometimes referred to as vav conversive, or vav ha'hipuch), which, in Biblical Hebrew, switches a verb between perfect and imperfect. For example, compare Judges 7:4  yelekh "let him go" with Deu. 31:1  vayyelekh "he went". A possible reason for this doubling is that the  'va-' prefix could be the remains of an auxiliary verb  hawaya (the ancient form of the verb  hayah, "to be") being contracted into a prefix, losing the initial 'ha', and the final 'ya' syllable disappearing and doubling the next letter.
 In some of the binyan verbal stems, where the Piel, Pual and Hitpa'el stems themselves cause doubling in the second root letter of a verb. For example:
 Ex. 15:9  achallek "I shall divide", Piel Stem, first person future tense 
 in the phrase  hallelu yah "praise the ", where hallelu is in Piel Stem, masculine plural Imperative form
 Gen. 47:31  vayyitchazzek, "he strengthened himself", Hitpael stem

Rafe 
In Masoretic manuscripts the opposite of a dagesh would be indicated by a rafe, a small line on top of the letter.  This is no longer found in Hebrew, but may still sometimes be seen in Yiddish and Ladino.

Unicode encodings 
In computer typography there are two ways to use a dagesh with Hebrew text. Here are Unicode examples:

Combining characters:
bet + dagesh: &#1489;&#1468; בּ = U+05D1 U+05BC
kaf + dagesh: &#1499;&#1468; כּ = U+05DB U+05BC
pe  + dagesh: &#1508;&#1468; פּ = U+05E4 U+05BC
Precomposed characters:
bet with dagesh: &#64305; בּ = U+FB31
kaf with dagesh: &#64315; כּ = U+FB3B
pe  with dagesh: &#64324; פּ = U+FB44

Some fonts, character sets, encodings, and operating systems may support neither, one, or both methods.

See also 

 Analogous to Dagesh Hazak, is the Shadda, in written Arabic
 Hebrew spelling
 Yiddish spelling
 Ladino spelling
 Mappiq
 Rafe
 Geresh
 Niqqud
 Biblical Hebrew
 Modern Hebrew

Notes

Further reading 
 , 
 M. Spiegel and J. Volk, 2003. "Hebrew Vowel Restoration with Neural Networks," Proceedings of the Class of 2003 Senior Conference, Computer Science Department, Swarthmore College, pp. 1–7: Open Access Copy

External links 
 alanwood.com Hebrew
 alanwood.com Alphabetic presentation

Niqqud